Jarl Lage Kulle (28 February 1927 – 3 October 1997) was a Swedish film and stage actor and director, and father of Maria Kulle.

Kulle was born in the village of Truedstorp, outside Ekeby, Sweden, and was the son of the merchant Nils Kulle and Mia Bergendahl. Kulle was one of the leading Swedish stage actors of his generation and often appeared in TV productions, at the Royal Dramatic Theatre of Stockholm as well as in a number of films, several of these directed by Ingmar Bergman. Taking on many star parts of the classical and modern repertory, appearing in contemporary TV drama and musicals and armed with remarkable gifts for both comedy, romantic drama and slightly declamatory but controlled pathos, he was one of Sweden's most loved modern actors.

In 1965 he won the award for Best Actor for his role in Swedish Wedding Night at the 2nd Guldbagge Awards. He won his second Guldbagge Best Actor award for Fanny and Alexander at the 19th Guldbagge Awards in 1983.

In 1960, Kulle married Louise Hermelin (born 1939), daughter of a cavalry captain, Baron Carl-Magnus Hermelin and Ann-Marie Sourander. They divorced in 1968. In 1976, Kulle married the actress Anne Nord. Kulle died in Gregersboda, Sweden in October 1997 of bone cancer.

Awards 
Kulle received many awards throughout his whole career. In 1952, he was the second actor to be awarded the Thaliapriset theatre award by the Swedish daily newspaper Svenska Dagbladet. He was also awarded the Gösta Ekman-stipendiet award in 1954, an award established in 1939 in memory of the actor and theatre director Gösta Ekman.

Filmography

References

External links 

 
 
 
 

1927 births
1997 deaths
20th-century Swedish male actors
Best Actor Bodil Award winners
Best Actor Guldbagge Award winners
Deaths from bone cancer
Deaths from cancer in Sweden
Eugene O'Neill Award winners
People from Ängelholm Municipality
People from Bjuv Municipality
Swedish film directors
Swedish male film actors
Swedish male stage actors